Cheltenham Festival may refer to:

 The Cheltenham Festival, a British horse racing event held in March 
Cheltenham Cricket Festival, an event centered around Gloucestershire County Cricket Club matches
 The Cheltenham Festivals, a series of music, literature and science events:
Cheltenham Jazz Festival
Cheltenham Science Festival
Cheltenham Music Festival
Cheltenham Literature Festival
 Other festivals held at Cheltenham, including:
 Cheltenham Food & Drink Festival
 Greenbelt Festival
 Wychwood Festival